Ornativalva zhengi is a moth of the family Gelechiidae. It was described by Hou-Hun Li in 1994. It is found in China.

References

Moths described in 1994
Ornativalva